Ruby Trichy Warriors is a Twenty20 cricket team representing the city of Tiruchirapalli in the Tamil Nadu Premier League. The team was formerly named Ruby Kanchi Warriors in the first season. Later it was renamed after the city of Trichy. In the 2nd season it finished as the 2nd last team in the points table.

See also 
 Indian Premier League
 Karnataka Premier League
 Rajputana Premier League

References

Tamil Nadu Premier League
Sport in Tamil Nadu
Cricket teams in India
Cricket in Tamil Nadu